A. J. Hedding (1883-1954) was a member of the Wisconsin State Assembly.

Biography
Hedding was born in 1883. He died in 1954 and was buried in Port Washington, Wisconsin.

Career
Hedding was first elected to the Assembly in 1912 to a seat previously held by W. J. Gilboy. Later, he became a judge in Milwaukee, Wisconsin.

References

Politicians from Milwaukee
Democratic Party members of the Wisconsin State Assembly
Wisconsin state court judges
1883 births
1954 deaths
Burials in Wisconsin
20th-century American judges
Lawyers from Milwaukee
20th-century American politicians
20th-century American lawyers